Zhang Jun may refer to:

Zhang Jun (ambassador), (born 1960), Permanent Representative of China to the United Nations since July 30, 2019
Zhang Jun (prince) (307–346), ruler of the Former Liang state in ancient China during the Sixteen Kingdoms period
Zhang Jun (Tang chancellor) (died 904), chancellor of the Tang dynasty
Zhang Jun (general) (1086–1154), general of the Song dynasty
Zhang Jun (Song chancellor) (1097–1164), chancellor of the Song dynasty
Zhang Jun (politician) (born 1956), Chinese Procurator General
Zhang Jun (economist) (born 1963), Chinese economist and Cheung Kong Professor of Economics at Fudan University
Zhang Jun (serial killer) (1966–2001), Chinese robber and serial killer
Zhang Jun (Kunqu) (born 1974), Chinese Kunqu opera singer and UNESCO Artist for Peace
Qiu Chuji (Taoist name Master Changchun) (born 1148), Chinese Taoist monk

Sportspeople
Zhang Jun (badminton) (born 1977), Chinese badminton player
Zhang Jun (shot putter) (born 1983), Chinese shot putter
Zhang Jun (footballer) (born 1992), Chinese footballer
Zhang Jun (racewalker) (born 1998), Chinese racewalker
Zhang Jun (judoka) (born 1987), Chinese judoka

See also
Zhang Qun